Deke Anderson (born March 16, 1959 in Reno, Nevada) is an American television and film actor and former body builder. Active from around the mid-1990s, he has had lead and supporting roles in some actioners earlier on in his career. He had a role as Eddie Reed in the soap opera The Days of Our Lives, and has appeared in General Hospital and Cheers. He is also known for later television work as Rick Dresden in Devious Maids and as Detective Johnson in Dreamsville. He played the part of Chief Stevens in Wayne Slaten's 2018 film Osprey.  He has also worked as an acting coach in later years.

Background
Prior to becoming an actor, Anderson was employed at a gym in Reno, Nevada. A co-worker by the name of Kane Hodder encouraged him to become a film actor. His earliest acting was as a singer with the Nevada Opera Guild.

Anderson runs Next Level Acting Studios which is located in The Woodlands, Texas. In 2001, Anderson was voted the no.1 acting coach in LA.

One of his earliest film roles was the 1990 film White Fury in which he had the lead role.

Career

1980s
His earliest role was in the 1984 beach comedy  Hardbodies, appearing as a bodybuilder. The following year he was in the film American Drive-In, playing the part of Denna's Boyfriend. In 1987, Force of Darkness, a film about a possessed man which starred Mel Novak, Doug Shanklin, Loren Cedar, and Eddie Hailey was released. He appeared in the film playing the part of a punk hoodlum. In 1988, he appeared in an episode of Cheers, "To All The Girls I've Loved Before" playing the part of Randy, a male stripper who gets the eye of Lilith after she fails to get s message from Frasier that their wedding is on.

In 1989, Anderson took on the role of Eddie Reed  in The Days of Our Lives which was previously played by Robert Parucha from 1988 to 1989. He had a reoccurring role in the series until the Eddie Reed character was killed off. Around that time he appeared as the bandaged-up Duke Lavery in General Hospital. There was speculation (as indicated by an articles in the Bluefield Daily Telegraph & Index Journal ) that Anderson could possibly carry on in the role as Lavery as Ian Buchanan who played Lavery had left the show.

Career

1990s
He had a supporting role in A Cry in the Wild, which starred Jared Rushton, Ned Beatty and Pamela Sue Martin. The film was a made for television adaptation of Gary Paulsen's novel Hatchet, a story about a 13-year-old boy learning to survive in the wilderness.
Anderson had a supporting role in the "Deep in the Heart of Dixie" episode of The Adventures of Brisco County Jr. which aired on November 5, 1993.

In 1990, Anderson had the main starring role in as bank robber Tyler Bennet in  the David A. Prior directed actioner White Fury, a story about two criminals who are on the run and terrorize four young adults who they find in a cabin in snowy Colorado wilderness. He played the part of Jason in the interactive movie video game Night Trap which was released in 1992. He appeared as Jason, a law enforcement colleague of Kelli who meets a tragic end in the game.

In 1994, he appeared in another David A. Prior directed film Felony, in a supporting role playing the part of Dennis. Jeffrey Combs, Ashley Laurence, Charles Napier, Lance Henriksen and Joe Don Baker also starred in the film.

He co-starred alongside Joe Estevez in the William Burke directed Psychic Detectives which was released in 1996.

2000s
Anderson had a voice acting role in the 2016 film, Legends of the Dark King: A Fist of the North Star Story as Igor.

He played the part of 4 Star General Caven in The Green Lantern which was released in 2011.

By 2008, Anderson and his wife had opened their second studio, which was Woodlands branch of Next Level Acting Studios. One of the students to come out of the studio was an Australian called Jake Staines. Stains, a local businessman competed for and was chosen over 200 other actors to land a featured role in a Ford-150 truck commercial which played during the Super Bowl.

In the 2010 anime anthology film, Halo Legends, he voices as Spartan 1337 in the segment, "Odd One Out".

He appeared as Paul Robinson in "Identity Crisis", an episode of The Resident that aired in February 2018.

In the 2017 series Dreamsville, Anderson played Chief Brian Johnson, an honest Houston cop who is involved in the "war on drugs".

Partial filmography

References

External links
 Filmweb: Deke Anderson
 Imdb: Deke Anderson
 TCM: Deke Anderson
 Next Level Acting Studio... Deke Anderson, Acting Coach

Living people
American acting coaches
Actors from Reno, Nevada
Male actors from Nevada
American male film actors
American male television actors
American male soap opera actors
American bodybuilders
1959 births